Kepsut is a town and district of Balıkesir Province in the Marmara region of Turkey. It had a population of 7286 in 2010, The mayor is İsmail Cankul (AKP).

References

External links
 District governor's official website 

Populated places in Balıkesir Province
Districts of Balıkesir Province